Christopher Paul Franks (born 2 August 1951) is a Welsh politician. A member of Plaid Cymru, he has led the party's group on the Vale of Glamorgan Council. Between 2007 and 2011 he was a member of the National Assembly for Wales losing in 2011.

Career
Franks was born in Cardiff, and educated at Llandaff College. He qualified as a civil engineer, and worked in the Highways and Transport Department of a local authority.

Political life
Franks was a Plaid Cymru councillor for Dinas Powys on South Glamorgan County Council from 1981 until the council's dissolution. He was elected to Vale of Glamorgan Council from Dinas Powys ward, and also to Dinas Powys Community Council. Franks was the Plaid Cymru candidate for Vale of Glamorgan in the 2001 general election, and shortly after the election was chosen as Plaid Cymru group leader on Vale of Glamorgan. He also fought the Vale of Glamorgan in the 1999 and 2003 elections to the National Assembly for Wales. In 2002, Franks challenged Owen John Thomas for the top place on the Plaid Cymru list in South Wales Central, but was unsuccessful.

Vale of Glamorgan council and leadership
After the 2004 elections to Vale of Glamorgan Council the Plaid Cymru group found itself with the 'balance of power' and Franks held meetings with both the Conservative and Labour leaders. Eventually, the Conservatives formed a minority administration which lasted until November 2006 when a crisis over social services cuts led to a vote of no confidence in the Conservative leader being passed. Franks declared that an all-party coalition was preferable. A coalition between Labour, Plaid Cymru and Independent councillors was agreed that December under which Franks became the cabinet member for Legal and Public Protection, a post that he no longer holds. Franks was neutral in his support for the coalition having abstained in the vote of no confidence.

In the 2017 elections, Franks lost his seat to the Conservatives but regained his seat in the 2022 elections.

National Assembly candidate
Franks was selected in May 2006 as second on Plaid Cymru's list for South Wales Central following the retirement of Owen John Thomas; Plaid had won two seats from the regional list in both previous elections to the Assembly. He duly retained the seat in the 2007 election.

References
Biography on the Plaid Cymru website

External links
Chris Franks'website

Offices held

1951 births
Living people
Plaid Cymru members of the Senedd
Wales AMs 2007–2011
Plaid Cymru politicians
Members of the Vale of Glamorgan Council
Plaid Cymru councillors
Members of South Glamorgan County Council